Dr. Beesetti Venkata Satyavathi is an Indian politician and a member of parliament to the 17th Lok Sabha from Anakapalli Lok Sabha constituency, Andhra Pradesh. She won the 2019 Indian general election being a YSR Congress Party candidate.

References

Living people
India MPs 2019–present
Lok Sabha members from Andhra Pradesh
YSR Congress Party politicians
1966 births